Guillermo Ferracuti (born 11 February 1991) is an Argentine professional footballer who plays as a left-back or centre-back for Deportivo Maipú.

Career
Ferracuti started in Newell's Old Boys' ranks in 2005. He was promoted into their senior squad at the back end of the 2010–11 Primera División season, starting matches against San Lorenzo, Olimpo and Colón as they secured a seventh place finish overall. Fifteen appearances followed up until July 2013, when the defender left on loan to Patronato in Primera B Nacional. He was selected eleven times by them. Ferracuti stayed in the second tier for the 2014 season, after departing Newell's Old Boys permanently to sign with Colón. The club won promotion to the Primera División in his first campaign; though just two matches followed for him.

Ahead of January 2016, Ferracuti joined Sarmiento. He made his bow on 13 February during an encounter with San Lorenzo, which was one of fifteen matches he played in for Sarmiento across two seasons; the last, 2016–17, concluded with relegation from the top-flight. On 15 August 2017, Guillermo Brown signed Ferracuti. In January 2022, Ferracuti joined Deportivo Maipú.

Career statistics
.

Honours
Newell's Old Boys
Primera División: 2012–13 Torneo Final

References

External links

1991 births
Living people
People from Rosario Department
Argentine footballers
Association football defenders
Argentine Primera División players
Primera Nacional players
Newell's Old Boys footballers
Club Atlético Patronato footballers
Club Atlético Colón footballers
Club Atlético Sarmiento footballers
Guillermo Brown footballers
Deportivo Maipú players
Sportspeople from Santa Fe Province